Welcome to Shama Town is a 2010 Chinese adventure film directed and written by Li Weiran, starring Sun Honglei, Lin Chi-ling, Li Liqun, and Gan Wei. It was distributed by Shanghai Media Group and LeTV Investment Co. Ltd and released by China Film Group Corporation, Huaxia Film Distribution Company, Dadi Time Film Distribution Co., LTD, and Shanghai Star Cultural Transmission Co., LTD. It was released in China on 22 June 2010.

The film received a nomination at the 47th Golden Horse Awards in the Best New Director category.

Cast
 Sun Honglei as Tang Gaopeng, the Village Chief of Shama Town.
 Lin Chi-ling as Chun Niang, Tang Gaopeng's lover.
 Li Liqun as Zhou Dingbang, the tomb raider.
 Gan Wei as Tao Hua
 Ma Jian as Gui Zhong.
 Xie Yuan as Mian Bin.
 Ma Delin as Da Pao.
 Huang Haibo as Da Cui, the cultural relics dealer.
 Cao Bingkun as Chen Dili.
 Bao Bei'er as Lu Maoku.
 Zhao Ziqi as the newspaper woman.
 Cica Zhou as the female bodyguard.
 Ma Li as Mian Bin's wife.
 Michael Stephen Kai as Xiao P.

Production
Sun Honglei filmed several scenes in Yongtai Ancient City, Yellow River Stone Forest, and Dunhuang Studio in Gansu, China.

Release
It was released in Mainland China on 22 June 2010.

Box office
It grossed ￥25 million on its opening weekend, it was a huge hit at the box office and flew straight to the top of the box office. It grossed ￥40 million on its second weekend.

References

External links
 
  
 

2010s Mandarin-language films
Chinese adventure comedy films
2010s adventure comedy films
2010 comedy films
2010 films